TV-Loonland AG was a German branding and management company that specialized in the production of children's programmes. The company's offices were located in Europe (Paris, Munich and London). The company's mascot is a sheep on the blue dome.

History
TMO Film GmbH was founded by Peter Volkle in 1989. The company first began working on animated content within this time, and by 1993 began to produce popular animated content. The company then released its first film - Die Schelme von Schelm, in 1995. In the same year, the company opened up an animation studio in Hungary called Loonland Animation in Hungary which TMO later purchased a stake in. The company then rebranded as TMO-Loonland Film GmbH in 1997. The company later purchased a stake in RG Prince Films in Korea, and increased the number of programmes being produced.

At the start of 2000, the company was rebranded to TV-Loonland AG. In March 2000, the company began to search for a UK sales agent for a planned expansion to the United Kingdom. In September 2000, the company purchased British animation studio Telemagination.

On October 3, 2000, the company purchased the television business assets of Sony Wonder, which included full ownership in animation studio Sunbow Entertainment, alongside a programming library that included shows based on Hasbro properties. In exchange for the purchase, Sony Wonder retained US distribution rights to the Sunbow catalogue and the European music rights.

On May 15, 2001, the company shuttered Family Harbour.

In November 2001, Loonland purchased a 29.9% stake in UK distributor Metrodome Distribution. This stake was later increased to a 54.4% operational control within the company by August 2002, and then a 75% stake by January 2003. However, by 2007, this stake was reduced to 61.2%.

In August 2005, Loonland was sued by shareholder group Aktieninvestor.com, after the company deliberately excused them from its AGM in August 2005, following violation of Section 21 of the Securities Trading Act when the latter tried to apply a hostile takeover within Loonland. The lawsuit ended in favour of TV-Loonland. On September 27, 2005, the company launched a feature-film division called Loonland Pictures, and signed deals with the local branch of 20th Century Fox and NFP Marketing as marketing and distribution partners for the companies' movies, the first of which being Heidi, which would be released theatrically in the country at the end of the year.

In October 2007, TV-Loonland announced they would sell off their 61.2% stake in Metrodome Distribution. In May 2008, Romanian company MediaPro purchased 50.1% of Loonland's shares in Metrodome for £3.2 Million, leaving them with 11.6% which MediaPro could purchase out in the future.

On May 14, 2008, Hasbro acquired the Sunbow programs based on its properties, which are now part of the Hasbro Studios library.

In December 2009, TV-Loonland announced they would file for bankruptcy protection. On April 5, 2011, Loonland's catalogue and remaining assets were sold to a fellow German entertainment company called m4e AG.

In February 2017, Studio 100 acquired a majority stake in m4e AG. Currently, Studio 100 owns the rights to most of the Loonland catalogue.

Programmes

Original
 Small Stories (1995-1998, as TMO Film, co-production with Les Films de l’Arlequin, in association with ARD, France 3, Canal J and EVA Entertainment)
 Tigerenten Club (1996, as TMO Film; "Janosch, Tigerente und Frosch" sequences)
 Robin (1996, as TMO Film, co-production with Happy Life)
 Big Sister, Little Brother (1997, as TMO Film, co-production with Wegelius TV)
 Ned's Newt (1997, as TMO Film (Series 1) and TMO-Loonland Film (Series 2–3), co-production with Nelvana and Studio B Productions (Series 2). Also held European distribution rights)
 Lisa (1998, as TMO Film)
 The Three Friends and Jerry (1998, as TMO Film, also held German distribution rights)
 The Little Lulu Show (1998, Series 3 only, as TMO-Loonland Film, co-production with CINAR Corporation)
 Fat Dog Mendoza (2000-2001, as TMO-Loonland Film, co-production with Sunbow Entertainment and Cartoon Network Europe. Also held German distribution rights)
 Babar (2000, as TMO-Loonland Film, additional animation only)
 Redwall (2000-2002, Series 2-3 only, co-production with Nelvana. Also held some European distribution rights)
 Pettson and Findus (2000)
 The Famous Jett Jackson (2000, Series 3 only, co-production with Alliance Atlantis. Also held European distribution rights)
 Letters From Felix (2001)
 The Fantastic Flying Journey (2001, co-production with Two Sides TV. Also held French-speaking, German-speaking, Eastern European, Scandinavian and Beneluxian distribution rights)
 The Cramp Twins (2001-2006, co-production with Sunbow Entertainment and Cartoon Network Europe)
 Little Ghosts (2002, co-production with Telemagination)
 Pongwiffy (2002, co-production with Telemagination)
 Something Else (2002, co-production with Studio B Productions, excluding Canadian distribution rights)
 Henry's World (2002-2005, Series 1 only, produced by Alliance Atlantis. Also held European distribution rights)
 Metalheads (2003, co-production with Telemagination)
 Dragon's Rock (2004, co-production with Super RTL)
 Rudi & Trudi (2006, co-production with Telemagination, ZDF Enterprises and ZDFtivi)
 Pat and Stan (2007)
 The Owl (2006, co-production with Studio Hari and France Télévisions)
 My Life Me (2009, co-production with CarpeDiem Film & TV)

Acquired from Sony Wonder/Sunbow Entertainment
 G.I. Joe: A Real American Hero (1983)
 The Transformers (1985)
 Super Sunday (1986)
 Jem and the Holograms (1985)
 Inhumanoids (1985)
 Robotix (1985)
 Bigfoot and the Muscle Machines (1985)
 My Little Pony 'n Friends (1986)
 The Glo Friends (1986)
 MoonDreamers (1986)
 Potato Head Kids (1986)
 Bucky O'Hare and the Toad Wars (1991)
 My Little Pony Tales (1992)
 Conan the Adventurer (1992)
 Conan and the Young Warriors (1994)
 Sgt. Savage and his Screaming Eagles (1994)
 G.I. Joe Extreme (1995)
 Salty's Lighthouse (1997)
 The Crayon Box (1997)
 The Brothers Flub (1999)
 Mega Babies (1999)
 Rainbow Fish (1999)
 Generation O! (2000)

Distribution only
 ReBoot (1994-2000, Europe, distribution rights acquired in 2001)
 Clifford the Big Red Dog (2000, Europe)
 In a Heartbeat
 Yvon of the Yukon (2001, Europe)
 Connie the Cow (2002, Europe excluding Spain)
 Clifford's Puppy Days (2003, Europe)
 Little Princess (2006)
 Penelope (2007, Europe, Russia, Baltic States, Scandinavia, Israel, the Middle East, and Africa)
 Mister Otter (2009)

Specials

Original
 The Last Polar Bears (2000, produced by Telemagination)
 Donner (2001, co-produced with Sunbow Entertainment and Rainbow Studios)

Acquired from Sony Wonder/Sunbow Entertainment
 Dorothy in the Land of Oz (1980)
 G.I. Joe: The Revenge of Cobra (1984)
 The GloFriends Save Christmas (1985)
 Transformers: Five Faces of Darkness (1986)
 Transformers: The Return of Optimus Prime (1986)
 Visionaries: Knights of the Magical Light(1987)
 Transformers: The Rebirth (1987)
 Santa's Special Delivery (1999)

Movies/Direct-to-Video

Original
 The Real Shlemiel (1994, as TMO Film)
 Kiss My Blood (1998, as TMO Film)
 Pettson and Findus (2000)
 Babar: King of the Elephants (1999, as TMO-Loonland, co-production with Nelvana. Also held German-speaking distribution rights)
 Heidi (2005, co-production with Telemagination and Nelvana. Also held European distribution rights)

Acquired from Sony Wonder/Sunbow Entertainment
 Alice of Wonderland in Paris (1966; international distribution rights)
 My Little Pony: The Movie (1986)
 The Transformers: The Movie (1986)
 G.I. Joe: The Movie (1987)
 Sony Wonder Enchanted Tales (1994-1999)
 The Beginner's Bible (1994-1990's)
 Famous Fred (1996)
 Lion of Oz (2000)

References

German animation studios
Companies established in 1989
Companies disestablished in 2011
Mass media companies of Germany